Callidina elegans, commonly known as the graceful callidina, is a species of freshwater rotifers in the family Adinetidae.

References 

 A History of Infusoria, living and fossil. Arranged according to "Die Infusionsthierchen" of C. G. Ehrenberg, containing coloured engravings illustrative of all the genera, and descriptions of all the species in that work ... To which are appended “An Account of those recently discovered in the chalk formations.” Andrew Pritchard, 1842

External links 

 Callidina elegans at iczn.org

Bdelloidea
Animals described in 1830
Taxa named by Christian Gottfried Ehrenberg